This article contains information about the literary events and publications of 1967.

Events
January
The first publication of Mikhail Bulgakov's novel The Master and Margarita («Ма́стер и Маргари́та»), in the form left at the author's death in 1940, concludes in the magazine Moskva, although censored portions circulate only in samizdat in the Soviet Union. It is first published in book form this year, by the YMCA Press in Paris.
Barbara Gordon is introduced as Batgirl in the Detective Comics series in the United States; when not exercising her superhero powers she uses her doctorate in library science as head of Gotham City public library.
March 16 – The first performance of D. H. Lawrence's January 1913 play The Daughter-in-Law is given at the Royal Court Theatre in London.
April 24 – The 18-year-old S. E. Hinton's Bildungsroman The Outsiders is published in the United States by Viking Press. She wrote it at the age of 15–16.
August 9 – The English playwright Joe Orton (aged 34) is battered to death by his partner, Kenneth Halliwell, who commits suicide in their north London home shortly after. Orton has completed work on a film script, Up Against It, for The Beatles (unproduced).
October 21 – American writer Norman Mailer is arrested for civil disobedience during the National Mobilization Committee to End the War in Vietnam March on The Pentagon.
November 9 – The first issue of the magazine Rolling Stone is published in San Francisco.
unknown dates
Aleksandr Solzhenitsyn's novel Cancer Ward is banned in the Soviet Union.
The influential New Wave science fiction anthology Dangerous Visions is published in the United States.
The Sabon typeface, designed by Jan Tschichold, is introduced.

New books

Fiction
Lloyd Alexander – Taran Wanderer
 Eric Ambler – Dirty Story
J. G. Ballard
The Day of Forever
The Disaster Area
The Overloaded Man
Lindsay Barrett – Song for Mumu
Luis Berenguer – El mundo de Juan Lobón
Thomas Berger – Killing Time
Thomas Bernhard – Verstörung (Disturbance, translated as Gargoyles)
Hilda Bernstein – The World that was Ours
Richard Brautigan – Trout Fishing in America
Mikhail Bulgakov (died 1940) – The Master and Margarita
Kenneth Bulmer
Cycle of Nemesis
To Outrun Doomsday
Arthur J. Burks – Black Medicine
Guillermo Cabrera Infante – Tres tristes tigres
Victor Canning – The Python Project
Angela Carter – The Magic Toyshop
Henry Cecil – A Woman Named Anne
Agatha Christie – Endless Night
John Christopher (Sam Youd)
The White Mountains
The City of Gold and Lead
Margaret Craven – I Heard the Owl Call My Name
L. Sprague de Camp editor – The Fantastic Swordsmen
R. F. Delderfield – Cheap Day Return
August Derleth editor – Travellers by Night
Margaret Drabble – Jerusalem the Golden
Nell Dunn – Poor Cow
Cameron Duodu – The Gab Boys
Allan W. Eckert – Wild Season
Mircea Eliade – The Old Man and the Bureaucrats
Janice Elliott – The Buttercup Chain
Claire Etcherelli – Elise, ou la vraie vie
C. S. Forester – Hornblower and the Crisis
Sarah Gainham – Night Falls on the City
Gabriel García Márquez – One Hundred Years of Solitude (Cien años de soledad)
William Golding – The Pyramid
Richard Gordon – The Facemaker
Winston Graham – The Walking Stick
 Edward Grierson – A Crime of One's Own
Paul Guimard – Intersection
S. E. Hinton – The Outsiders
William Hope Hodgson – Deep Waters
Robert E. Howard
Conan the Warrior
(with L. Sprague de Camp) – Conan the Usurper
(with L. Sprague de Camp and Lin Carter) – Conan
James Jones – Go to the Widow-Maker
Anna Kavan – Ice
Elia Kazan – The Arrangement
Thomas Keneally – Bring Larks and Heroes
Milan Kundera – The Joke (Žert)
Alex La Guma – The Stone-Country
Ira Levin – Rosemary's Baby
Joan Lindsay – Picnic at Hanging Rock
H. P. Lovecraft – Three Tales of Horror
Alistair MacLean – Where Eagles Dare
Naguib Mahfouz – Miramar
Daniel Pratt Mannix IV – The Fox and the Hound
Ngaio Marsh – Death at the Dolphin
Catherine Marshall – Christy
Berkely Mather – The Gold of Malabar
V. S. Naipaul – The Mimic Men
R. K. Narayan – The Vendor of Sweets
Ngũgĩ wa Thiong'o – A Grain of Wheat
Flann O'Brien (died 1966) – The Third Policeman (written 1939–40)
Scott O'Dell – The Black Pearl
Kenzaburō Ōe (大江 健三郎) – The Silent Cry (万延元年のフットボール, Man'en Gannen no Futtoboru)
K. M. Peyton – Flambards
Chaim Potok – The Chosen
Marin Preda – Moromeţii, Vol. 2
E. Hoffmann Price – Strange Gateways
J. B. Priestley – It's an Old Country
Valentin Rasputin – Money for Maria (Деньги для Марии)
Ruth Rendell – A New Lease of Death
Thomas Savage – The Power of the Dog
Gaia Servadio – Tanto gentile e tanto onesta
Mary Stewart – The Gabriel Hounds
William Styron – The Confessions of Nat Turner
Julian Symons – The Man Who Killed Himself
Piri Thomas – Down These Mean Streets
Leon Uris – Topaz
Jack Vance – The Palace of Love
Thornton Wilder – The Eighth Day
Colin Wilson – The Mind Parasites
Roger Zelazny – Lord of Light (Hugo Award Winner 1968)

Children and young people
Rev. W. Awdry – Small Railway Engines (twenty-second in The Railway Series of 42 books)
Helen Cresswell – The Piemakers
Ingri and Edgar Parin d'Aulaire – Norse Gods and Giants
John D. Fitzgerald – The Great Brain
Alan Garner – The Owl Service
Rumer Godden – Home is the Sailor
S. E. Hinton – The Outsiders
Aldous Huxley (died 1963) – The Crows of Pearblossom (short story written 1944)
E. L. Konigsburg
From the Mixed-Up Files of Mrs. Basil E. Frankweiler
Jennifer, Hecate, Macbeth, William McKinley, and Me, Elizabeth
Boy Lornsen – Robbi, Tobbi und das Fliewatüüt
Ann MacGovern and Simms Taback – Too Much Noise
Ruth Manning-Sanders – A Book of Wizards
Daniel P. Mannix (with John Schoenherr) – The Fox and the Hound
Bill Martin Jr. – Brown Bear, Brown Bear, What Do You See? (board book)
R. D. Mascott – The Adventures of James Bond Junior 003½
Jessica Nelson North – The Giant's Shoe
Bill Peet
Buford the Little Bighorn
Jennifer and Josephine
K. M. Peyton – Flambards (first in eponymous series of four books)
Joan G. Robinson – When Marnie Was There
Barbara Sleigh – Jessamy
Zilpha Keatley Snyder
The Egypt Game
The Gypsy Game

Drama
Simon Gray – Wise Child
Christopher Hampton – Total Eclipse
Peter Handke – Kaspar
Dorothy Hewett – This Old Man Comes Rolling Home
Rolf Hochhuth – Soldiers (Soldaten: Nekrolog auf Genf)
Peter Nichols – A Day in the Death of Joe Egg
Efua Sutherland – Edufa
Vijay Tendulkar – Shantata! Court Chalu Aahe
Peter Ustinov – The Unknown Soldier and His Wife
Luis Valdez – Los Vendidos
Charles Wood – Dingo
Leonid Zorin – A Warsaw Melody

Poetry

Roger McGough, Brian Patten and Adrian Henri – The Mersey Sound

Non-fiction
J. A. Baker – The Peregrine
Dmitri Borgmann – Beyond Language
Peter Brown – Augustine of Hippo: A Biography
Robert Coles – A Study in Courage and Fear, volume 1 of Children of Crisis
L. Sprague de Camp and Catherine Crook de Camp – The Story of Science in America
Joseph Fletcher – Moral Responsibility
E. D. Hirsch – Validity in Interpretation
Rod Horton and Herbert Edwards – Backgrounds of American Literary Thought
Martin Luther King Jr. – Where Do We Go from Here: Chaos or Community?
Ira M. Lapidus – Muslim Cities in the Later Middle Ages
Robert MacArthur and E. O. Wilson – The Theory of Island Biogeography
Marshall McLuhan and Quentin Fiore – The Medium is the Massage: An Inventory of Effects
William Manchester – The Death of a President
Robert K. Massie – Nicholas and Alexandra
Desmond Morris – The Naked Ape
Josep Pla – Life Embitters (La vida amarga)
Paul Robert (editor) – Petit Robert abridged dictionary
Valerie Solanas – SCUM Manifesto
A. T. Q. Stewart – The Ulster Crisis: Resistance to Home Rule 1912–14

Births
January 7 – Benjamin Kwakye, Ghanaian novelist
March 8 – Mitsuyo Kakuta (角田 光代), Japanese novelist and translator
April 19 – Steven H Silver, American science fiction writer
June 16 – Maylis de Kerangal, French novelist
July 11 – Jhumpa Lahiri, English-born Indian/American writer
July 19
Zoran Drvenkar, Croatian German novelist
Wladimir Kaminer, Russian German short story writer
July 31 – Elizabeth Wurtzel, American memoirist (Prozac Nation) (died 2020)
September 21 – Suman Pokhrel, Nepali poet, lyricist, playwright, translator and artist
October 4 –  Miloš Urban, Czech novelist
December 12 – Robert Lepage, French Canadian playwright, actor and director
Uncertain date – S. F. Said, Lebanese-born British children's fiction writer

Deaths
January 29 – Ion Buzdugan, Romanian poet and political figure (born 1887)
February 8 – Victor Gollancz, English publisher (born 1893)
March 2 – José Martínez Ruiz (Azorín), Spanish novelist (born 1873)
March 7 – Alice B. Toklas, American memoirist and autobiographer (born 1893)
March 30 – Jean Toomer, African American writer (born 1894)
May 12 – John Masefield, English Poet Laureate (born 1878)
May 22 – Langston Hughes, American poet, novelist and playwright (born 1902)
June 3 – Arthur Ransome, English author of children's and other books (born 1884)
June 4 – J. R. Ackerley, English journalist (born 1896)
June 7 – Dorothy Parker, American humorist (born 1893)
July 22
Lajos Kassák, Hungarian poet, novelist and translator (born 1887)
Carl Sandburg, American historian and poet (born 1878)
July 31 – Margaret Kennedy, English novelist and playwright (born 1896)
August 2 – Giles Romilly, English journalist (tranquilizer overdose, born 1916)
August 9 – Joe Orton, English playwright (murdered, born 1933)
August 29 – Sidney Bradshaw Fay, American historian and author (born 1876)
September 1 – Siegfried Sassoon, English poet and memoirist (born 1886)
September 12 – Vladimir Bartol, Slovene author (born 1903)
September 16 – Pavlo Tychyna, Ukrainian poet (born 1891)
September 24 – Robert van Gulik, Dutch author (cancer, born 1910)
September 29 – Carson McCullers, American novelist (brain hemorrhage, born 1917)
September – Christopher Okigbo, Nigerian poet (killed in action, born 1930)
October 8 – Vernon Watkins, Welsh poet (heart failure, born 1906)
October 9 – André Maurois, French novelist (born 1885)
October 13 – Georges Sadoul, French journalist and writer on cinema (born 1904)
October 14 – Marcel Aymé, French novelist and children's author (born 1902)
October 25 – Margaret Ayer Barnes, American author and playwright (born 1886)
November 17 – Bo Bergman, Swedish poet (born 1869)
November 30 – Patrick Kavanagh, Irish poet (born 1904)

Awards
Nobel Prize for Literature: Miguel Ángel Asturias

Canada
See 1967 Governor General's Awards for a complete list of winners and finalists for those awards.

France
Prix Goncourt: André Pieyre de Mandiargues, La Marge
Prix Médicis: Claude Simon, Histoire

United Kingdom
Carnegie Medal for children's literature: Alan Garner, The Owl Service
Cholmondeley Award: Seamus Heaney, Brian Jones, Norman Nicholson
Eric Gregory Award: Angus Calder, Marcus Cumberlege, David Harsent, David Selzer, Brian Patten
James Tait Black Memorial Prize for fiction: Margaret Drabble, Jerusalem The Golden
James Tait Black Memorial Prize for biography: Winifred Gérin, Charlotte Brontë: The Evolution of Genius
Queen's Gold Medal for Poetry: Charles Causley

United States
Frost Medal: Marianne Moore
Hugo Award: Robert A. Heinlein, The Moon Is a Harsh Mistress
Nebula Award: Samuel R. Delany, The Einstein Intersection
Newbery Medal for children's literature: Irene Hunt, Up a Road Slowly
Pulitzer Prize for Drama: Edward Albee, A Delicate Balance
Pulitzer Prize for Fiction & National Book Award: Bernard Malamud – The Fixer
Pulitzer Prize for Poetry: Anne Sexton: Live or Die

Elsewhere
Akutagawa Prize: Oshiro Tatsuhiro (大城立裕), The Cocktail Party
Miles Franklin Award: Thomas Keneally, Bring Larks and Heroes
Premio Nadal: José María Sanjuán, Réquiem por todos nosotros
Viareggio Prize: Raffaello Brignetti, Il gabbiano azzurro

References

 
Years of the 20th century in literature